The 1965 Philadelphia Eagles season was the franchise's 33rd season in the National Football League.

The Philadelphia Eagles compiled a record of 5 wins to 9 losses out of the 14 games played. The team was led by Joe Kuharich with ownership duties belonging to Jerry Wolman. The Eagles began the season with a win against the St. Louis Cardinals followed by a loss to the New York Giants. After a win against the Dallas Cowboys, the Eagles lost four straight games, dropping them from the playoff hunt. The team ended the season in 5th place within the NFL Eastern Conference.

Off Season

NFL Draft 
The NFL and the American Football League (AFL) competed with each other for the same pool of college players each year. The 1965 NFL Draft and the 1965 AFL Draft both took place on Saturday, November 28, 1964. This was the day of the Army–Navy Game, which is normally the last game of the college season before the bowl games.

The two leagues' drafts were separate from each other and some players were drafted by both leagues. The AFL was going strong in wanting stars signed and would do what they could to please the players if they signed with the AFL. Joe Namath would sign with the AFL if he could play in New York; he eventually signed a three-year contract worth $427,000 with the New York Jets. (Not all of this amount was for Namath himself. $120,000 went toward salaries for three of his relatives over that three-year period as well as for lawyer's fees.) As in earlier years, some players signed "AFL contracts" with the league itself as soon as their last college game was over, and when they were drafted by an AFL team the contract was transferred from the league to the team. To help fight this, the NFL moved its draft up to near the end of the college season, but this move was quickly matched by the AFL.

A new kind of job was created, "baby sitter". Their job was to hang with the draft prospect, and keep him away from the other league's representatives. One of the Eagles' draft picks, Otis Taylor, was held in a motel and had to "escape" from his NFL baby sitter. He later signed with the AFL's Kansas City Chiefs for money and a "red Thunderbird convertible" that the AFL baby sitter was driving. Taylor noticed how a lot of people stared at the car when they drove by, and he wanted one.

The first player selected in the NFL draft was Tucker Frederickson, running back from Auburn, by the New York Giants. The draft was marked by the failure of the St. Louis Cardinals to sign Joe Namath, who instead signed with the AFL's New York Jets. He and the Jets would go on to defeat the NFL's Baltimore Colts for the World Championship in Super Bowl III after the 1968 season.

Player selections

Regular season

Schedule 

Conference opponents are in bold text.

Standings

Roster

Awards and honors 
 Pete Retzlaff, Bert Bell Award

References 

 Eagles on Pro Football Reference
 Eagles on jt-sw.com

Philadelphia Eagles seasons
Philadelphia Eagles
Philadel